Haldimand County is a rural city-status single-tier municipality on the Niagara Peninsula in Southern Ontario, Canada, on the north shore of Lake Erie, and on the Grand River. Despite its name, it is no longer a county by definition, as all municipal services are handled by a single level of government. Municipal offices are located in Cayuga.

The county is adjacent to Norfolk County, the County of Brant, the City of Hamilton, and the Regional Municipality of Niagara.

History
Haldimand's history has been closely associated with that of neighbouring Norfolk County. Upper Canada was created in 1791 by being separated from the old Province of Quebec,  Haldimand was created in 1798 as part of the Niagara District. It was named after Sir Frederick Haldimand, the governor of the Province of Quebec from 1778 to 1785. In 1844, the land was surrendered by the Six Nations to the Crown in an agreement that was signed by the vast majority of Chiefs in the Haldimand tract. From 1974 to 2000, Haldimand County and Norfolk County were merged to form the Regional Municipality of Haldimand-Norfolk. See Regional Municipality of Haldimand–Norfolk and Norfolk County History for the period when Haldimand and Norfolk were governed as a single unit.

Beginning in February 2006, a land dispute by native protesters began near Caledonia over a housing development being built on the outskirts of town, which members of the nearby Mohawk Six Nations people claim is rightfully their land.

Communities
The population centres in Haldimand are Caledonia, Dunnville, Hagersville, Jarvis and Cayuga. Part of the Six Nations Reserve is within the geographic area of Haldimand County, but is independent of the county. Most of Haldimand is agricultural land, although some heavy industry, including the former Nanticoke Generating Station, is located here.

Smaller communities within the municipality are Attercliffe Station, Balmoral, Bodri Bay, Brookers Bay, Byng, Canborough, Canfield, Cheapside, Clanbrassil, Crescent Bay, Decewsville, Empire Corners, Featherstone Point, Fisherville, Garnet, Hoover Point, Kohler, Little Buffalo, Lowbanks, Moulton Station, Mount Carmel, Mount Healy, Nanticoke, Nelles Corners, Peacock Point, Port Maitland, Rainham Centre, Selkirk, Sims Lock, South Cayuga, Springvale, Stromness, Sweets Corners, Townsend, Willow Grove, Woodlawn Park and York.

The ghost towns of Cook's Station, Cranston, Dufferin, Erie, Indiana, Lambs Corners, Lythmore, Sandusk, Upper, and Varency are also located within Haldimand.

Historic townships
Haldimand County's area of 309,300 acres was formed from part of the land grant to the Six Nations in 1783. The County was purchased by treaty and opened for general settlement in 1832. It was first settled by white veterans of Butler's Rangers established there by Joseph Brant. A large number of Germans were among the first settlers.

Canborough, area . Granted in 1794 by Joseph Brant to John Dochstader of Butler's Rangers. Purchased by Benjamin Canby in 1810 for £5,000, he named the village-site "Canborough. Community centre: Canborough, Darling and it touches Dunnville
Dunn, area . Opened for settlement in 1833. Community centre: Dunnville
Moulton, area . Landowner Henry John Boulton named the township from the Boulton family seat in England.
North Cayuga, area .
Oneida, area . Joseph Brant granted a 999 year lease of part of Oneida and Seneca townships to Henry Nelles, of Butler's Rangers and his sons, Robert, Abraham, William, Warner and John. Community centres were: Caledonia, Dufferin and Hagersville.
Rainham, area  Community centres: Balmoral, Selkirk, Rainham Centre and Fisherville.
Seneca, area . Community centres: York and Caledonia
Sherbrooke, area , the smallest township in Ontario. Opened in 1825 and named from Sir John Coape Sherbrooke, a Governor-General of Canada. The Township was granted by the Indians to William Dickson (a lawyer) as a professional fee. Community centres: Stromness and Port Maitland.
South Cayuga, area .
Walpole, area . Community centres were: Hagersville, Jarvis, Selkirk, Cheapside and Nanticoke.

Source: Province of Ontario – A History 1615 to 1927 by Jesse Edgar Middleton & Fred Landon, copyright 1927, Dominion Publishing Company, Toronto

Demographics

Ethnicity 
Only ethnic groups that comprise greater than 1% of the population are included. Note that a person can report more than one group.
English: 37.4%
"Canadian": 32.7%
Scottish: 24.9%
Irish: 20.1%
German: 18.4%
Dutch: 13.4%
French: 8.6%
Italian: 4.4%
Aboriginal: 3.3%
Ukrainian: 2.7%
Polish: 2.7%
Hungarian: 2.4%
Welsh: 2.0%
British Isles (other): 1.7%
Portuguese: 1.3%

Local government
The city is within the federal electoral riding of Haldimand—Norfolk and within provincial electoral riding of Haldimand—Norfolk.

Current Mayor: Shelley Ann Bentley

Previous Mayors:

 2010–2022: Ken Hewitt

 2004–2010: Marie Trainer
 2000–2004: Lorraine Bergstrand

Policing
Policing in the county is provided by the Haldimand detachment of the Ontario Provincial Police located in Cayuga.

Fire services
Fire services in the county is provided by the Haldimand County Fire Department which was created in 2001 following the separation of Haldimand and Norfolk. The department currently consists of 11 stations located strategically throughout the county. With almost 300 firefighters and 40 fire apparatuses, it is one of the largest volunteer fire departments in Ontario. The department consists of:

 Station 1 – Caledonia
 Station 2 – Hagersville
 Station 3 – Jarvis
 Station 4 – Cayuga (Headquarters)
 Station 5 – Canfield
 Station 6 – Canborough
 Station 7 – Lowbanks
 Station 9 – Dunnville
 Station 11 – South Haldimand
 Station 12 – Fisherville
 Station 13 – Selkirk

Transportation

The Southern Ontario Railway operates in southwestern Haldimand.

Highways that travel through Haldimand include Ontario Highway 3 and Ontario Highway 6.

Protected areas
Haldimand Conservation Area
Selkirk Provincial Park
Taquanyah Conservation Area
Hedley Forest Conservation Area
Canborough Conservation Area
Ruigrok Tract Conservation Area
Oswego Conservation Area
Byng Island Conservation Area
Rock Point Provincial Park
Mohawk Island National Wildlife Area

Attractions
Port Maitland Outer Range Lighthouse and Pier
Canadian Heritage Grand River
Grand Valley Trail
Toronto Motorsports Park (Dragway Park)
Indiana Ghost Town 
Ruthven Park National Historic Site Mansion and Park
Haldimand County Museum & Archives (Cayuga)
Jukasa Motor Speedway
Grand River Dinner Cruises
Edinburgh Square Heritage Centre (Caledonia)
Killman Zoo
Cottonwood Mansion
Caledonia Grand Trunk Station
The Wilson Pugsley MacDonald Museum (c. 1872) is a National Historic Site of Canada on the Canadian Register of Historic Places.  The Museum was named in honour of Wilson MacDonald
No. 6 RCAF Dunnville Museum
Canadian Drilling Rig Museum
Caledonia Old Mill
Byng Island Conservation Area and Pool
Mohawk Island Lighthouse (abandoned)
Townsend Planned Community (1970)
Nanticoke Generating Station

Notable people
 Birthplace of Canadian Olympic high jump medalist Ethel Catherwood.
 Birthplace of Canadian Women's Hockey Gold Medalist Becky Kellar-Duke
 Birthplace of Spud Johnson Major League Baseball player 
 Boston Bruins' Nathan Horton, who won the Stanley Cup in 2011
 San Jose Sharks Head Coach Peter DeBoer
 Ottawa Senators goaltender Cam Talbot
 Late NHL goaltender Ray Emery, who won Stanley Cup in 2013
 Marty McSorley, retired NHL player
 Peter Robertson, inventor of the Robertson screw

See also
List of townships in Ontario
List of secondary schools in Ontario#Haldimand County

Notes

References

External links

 
Cities in Ontario
Former counties in Ontario
Single-tier municipalities in Ontario
Populated places disestablished in 1974
Southwestern Ontario
Populated places on Lake Erie in Canada